Kenny Pallraj a/l Davaragi (born 21 April 1993) is a Malaysian professional footballer who plays as a defensive midfielder for Malaysia Super League club Kuala Lumpur City.

Club career

Perak
Kenny began his football career playing for Perak youth team before he signed with Harimau Muda in 2015 and featured in Singaporean S.League. Kenny returned to Perak for 2016 Malaysia Super League season.

International career
On 5 July 2018, Kenny made his debut for Malaysia national team in a friendly match against Fiji.

Career statistics

Club

International

Honours

Kuala Lumpur City
 Malaysia Cup: 2021

Perak
 Malaysia Super League runner-up: 2018 
 Malaysia Cup: 2018
 Malaysia FA Cup runner-up: 2019

Malaysia
 AFF Championship runner-up: 2018

References

External links
 
 

1993 births
Living people
Malaysian footballers
Perak F.C. players
Kuala Lumpur City F.C. players
Malaysia Super League players
People from Perak
Association football midfielders